Royal Air Force Saltby or more simply RAF Saltby is a former Royal Air Force station located near Saltby, Leicestershire, England

The following units were here at some point:
 No. 14 Operational Training Unit RAF
 No. 32 Heavy Glider Maintenance Section
 No. 216 Maintenance Unit RAF
 No. 255 Maintenance Unit RAF
 No. 256 Maintenance Unit RAF
 No. 1665 Heavy Conversion Unit RAF
 314th Troop Carrier Group
 32nd Troop Carrier Squadron
 50th Troop Carrier Squadron
 61st Troop Carrier Squadron
 62nd Troop Carrier Squadron

References

S